Serge Roullet (6 July 1926 – 14 February 2023) was a French film director and screenwriter. He directed eight films from 1959. His 1967 film The Wall was entered into the 17th Berlin International Film Festival.

Roullet died on 14 February 2023, at the age of 96.

Selected filmography
 The Wall (1967)
 Le Voyage étranger (1992)

References

External links
 Serge Roullet's Official site

1926 births
2023 deaths
French cinematographers
French film directors
French film producers
French male screenwriters
French screenwriters
People from Bordeaux